Architechs is an English electronic music act which currently consists of Paul Akabah (Tre Lowe). Former members are Ashley Akabah and producer Kevin Williams (K-Warren).

Architechs gained international attention in 1998 after producing a UK garage remix of Brandy and Monica's "The Boy Is Mine", selling over 40,000 copies of the bootleg. They also produced remixes of songs by several popular artists, including All Saints, Gabrielle, Faithless, Garbage, Beenie Man, Inaya Day and Jamelia. Several of their tracks have featured on the compilation series Pure Garage.

In 1999, K-Warren left the group to pursue a solo career. Ashley and Paul went on to remix for numerous artists, and collaborated with singer Nana (pronounced "neyney"), who features on both of the Architechs' commercially successful singles "Body Groove" and "Show Me the Money", as well as releasing a solo R&B record in 2005.

Ashley Akabah died on 2 February 2020 in Notting Hill, West London at the age of 49.

Discography

Singles

References

External links
 Architechs on Discogs

English electronic music duos
UK garage duos
Sibling musical duos
Male musical duos
Musical groups from London
Black British musical groups